Horse Creek (also Horsecreek) is an unincorporated community in southeastern Greene County, Tennessee. Horse Creek is located southeast of Tusculum.

Horse Creek is the location of Horse Creek Recreation Area, a Cherokee National Forest recreation area.

2011 Tornado

Horse Creek along with Camp Creek were hit with 2 EF-3 tornadoes on April 27, 2011.

Notable people
 Christian Burgner ( 1811-1886 ) Master cabinet maker and wood worker. Born in Horse Creek September, 13. Son of Peter Burgner ( 1773-1824 ). Christian married Malinda Elizabeth Fullen ( 1822-1901 ). They had 10 children. 

 John Calvin Burgner ( 1797-1863 ) Master Cabinet maker and woodworker. Brother of Christian Burgner.  Born in Woodstock, Virginia October, 30.

References

Unincorporated communities in Tennessee
Unincorporated communities in Greene County, Tennessee